Leverano is a town and comune in the province of Lecce in the southeastern part of the Apulia region of south-east Italy.  It is bounded by the comuni of Arnesano, Carmiano, Copertino, Nardò and Veglie.

History

Leverano was severely destroyed by the Ostrogoth Totila, it was also destroyed by the Arabs in the 9th century.  A tower was later built in 1220 and it protected against pirate raids.  The tower is built with Norman architecture.

Leverano DOC
The area around Leverano produces both red, white and rose Italian DOC wine, though the region produces vastly more red wine than anything else. The grapes are limited to a harvest yield of 15 tonnes/ha. Red wines must have a finished alcohol level of at least 12% and are composed of at least 65% Negroamaro and up to 35% of the assorted blend of Malvasia, Sangiovese and Montepulciano. White wines must have a minimum alcohol level of at least 11% and be composed by at least 65% Malvasia bianca with Trebbiano and Bombino bianco allowed to make up the remaining 35%.

Twinning

  Sfakiotes, Greece
Guillena, Spain

References

External links
 Official website

Cities and towns in Apulia
Localities of Salento